Greenwood, Ontario, may refer to:

 Greenwood, Durham Regional Municipality, Ontario
 Greenwood, a community in Laurentian Valley, Renfrew County, Ontario
 Greenwood (electoral district), a federal electoral district in Toronto, represented in the Canadian House of Commons from 1935 to 1979